The following is a list of county routes in Union County in the U.S. state of New Jersey.  For more information on the county route system in New Jersey as a whole, including its history, see County routes in New Jersey.

500-series county routes
In addition to those listed below, the following 500-series county routes serve Union County:
CR 509, CR 509 Spur, CR 512, CR 514, CR 527, CR 531, CR 577

Other county routes

See also

References

 
Union